During the 1991–92 English football season, West Ham United F.C. competed in the Football League First Division.

Season summary
1991–92 was West Ham United's first season back in the First Division following promotion, ending a two-year absence from the top flight.

However, their return to the First Division lasted just one season and they were relegated in bottom place, missing out on a place in the new FA Premier League, which would be created for the 1992-93 season. Their chances of survival were not helped by the fact that key players Trevor Morley and Julian Dicks missed large stretches of the season due to injury and off-field issues, such as the infamous Bond Scheme, which exacerbated the club's poor league form.

The few bright spots of the season came in the final stages – after relegation was confirmed – in the shape of a 1–0 win over Manchester United which effectively ended the opposition's title hopes, and then came a 3–0 demolition of eighth-placed Nottingham Forest in which striker Frank McAvennie ended his second spell at Upton Park by scoring a hat-trick. The season could have ended very differently for the Hammers had they been able to show such fine form on a more regular basis.

Final league table

Results
West Ham United's score comes first

Legend

Football League First Division

FA Cup

League Cup

Full Members Cup

Squad

Reserve squad

Transfers

In

Out

Transfers in:  £1,000,000
Transfers out:  £540,000
Total spending:  £460,000

References

West Ham United F.C. seasons
West Ham United
West Ham United
West Ham United